Mimi Feigelson is an Orthodox Jewish rabbi, scholar and spiritual leader.

Born in the United States, she moved to Israel at age eight and began studying with Rabbi Shlomo Carlebach at age fifteen. She says that in 1994, he granted her religious ordination (smicha), normally reserved for men. This was revealed in 2000 in an article by the New York Jewish Week. Feigelson is also described as being ordained in 1994 by a panel of three rabbis after Carlebach's death. She is currently a lecturer in the rabbinic school at American Jewish University in Los Angeles, and the students’ mashpiah ruchanit, or spiritual guide. She uses the title "Reb" rather than "Rabbi."

Mimi Feigelsohn was among the few Orthodox women rabbis to have received private ordination in the Orthodox Jewish context before the institutional change that resulted in the foudning of Yeshivat Maharat. Other women in her position include Haviva Ner-David and Dina Najman (both ordained in 2006).

See also 
 Sara Hurwitz
 Dina Brawer

References 

Living people
American Jewish University faculty
American Orthodox Jews
Women rabbis
Year of birth missing (living people)
Orthodox women rabbis